Saah Tboy "T-Boy" Fayia (born February 1, 2001) is a Canadian soccer player who plays as a defender.

Early life
Fayia was born in Monrovia, Liberia, but grew up in Edmonton, Alberta. Fayia began playing youth soccer at age five with Edmonton Strikers SC. Afterwards, he played for Sherwood Park SA. In August 2015, he joined the Vancouver Whitecaps Residency program. In 2019, he moved to the academy system of FC Edmonton.

Club career
In June 2021, Canadian Premier League club FC Edmonton announced they had signed Fayia to a contract. He made his professional debut on August 3 against Cavalry FC. In October 2021, he earned league Team of the Week honours, after a standout performance in a match against Cavalry FC, in which he earned an assist. In February 2022, Edmonton announced Fayia would be returning to the club ahead of the 2022 CPL season.

International career
In 2015 and 2016, Fayia participated in U-15 identification camps for Canada.

Personal life
Fayia is the cousin of former FC Edmonton player Hanson Boakai.

Career statistics

References

External links

2001 births
Living people
Canadian people of Liberian descent
Sportspeople of Liberian descent
Liberian emigrants to Canada
Canadian soccer players
Liberian footballers
Soccer players from Edmonton
Sportspeople from Monrovia
Association football defenders
Canadian Premier League players
Vancouver Whitecaps Residency players
FC Edmonton players